Wreay is a small English village that lies on the River Petteril in today's Cumbria. The M6 motorway, A6 trunk road and West Coast Main Line railway all skirt the village.

Governance
Wreay was once a civil parish, In 1931 it had a population of 131. It was incorporated in 1934 into the parish of St Cuthbert Without and in 1974 into the City of Carlisle.

Wreay is in the parliamentary constituency of Penrith and the Border. Neil Hudson was elected its Conservative Member of Parliament at the 2019 General Election, replacing Rory Stewart.

Before Brexit, it was in the North West England European Parliamentary Constituency.

Church
Wreay is noted for St Mary's Church, an adjacent mausoleum, and a copy of the 7th-century Bewcastle Cross.

The church, designed and built in basilica form in 1840–1842 by the local landowner Sara or Sarah Losh and the stonemason William Hindson, exhibits an original style which she called "early Saxon or modified Lombard". It makes striking use of carved plant and animal motifs. As the church website points out, "St Mary's embodies many of the attributes of the Arts and Crafts Movement and yet predates it by some 50 years." The carvings embody symbolism that "refers to death, rebirth and eternity, drawing upon Christian, pagan and personal references. It is a Grade II* listed building. The church replaced a small medieval chapel on a different site, which had become dilapidated by the 1830s. Recent repairs and restoration of the church have involved relaying sandstone roof slabs, internal redecoration, installing a new heating and lighting system, and constructing a new vestry. The church received a private visit from HRH Prince Charles in 2009.

Near the church is a Grade II listed mausoleum designed and erected by Sara Losh in 1850 in memory of her sister Katharine (1787–1817). Plans to restore this chapel of rest were announced in 2012. It contains a white marble statue of Katherine Losh, carved by a local sculptor, David Dunbar (1793–1866). Next to it is a Grade II listed reconstruction of the Saxon Bewcastle Cross, erected by Sara Losh around 1835, possibly in memory of her parents, John and Isabella Losh, but with an inscription apparently referring to the recent loss of her sister. Also by Sara Losh is the Grade II listed sexton's cottage.

Heritage
The chapel was recorded in William Hutchinson's Directory of Cumberland, published in 1738: "The chapel of Wrea, in the parish of St Cuthbert is as ancient, at least, as the reign of King Henry II, for in the year 1319 Bishop Halton allowed a chaplain to it to attend divine office on condition that he resided upon the place.... The chapelry consists of the villages of Wrea of 20 families and Newbiggin."

An entry for the village appeared in 1870/1872, in John Marius Wilson's Imperial Gazetteer of England and Wales: "WREAY, a chapelry in Carlisle-St. Mary parish, Cumberland; on the Lancaster and Carlisle railway, 5½ miles SSE of Carlisle. It has a post-office under Carlisle, and a r. station. Acres, 1,088. Real property, £1,967. Pop., 166. Houses, 31. The property is divided among a few. The living is a p. curacy in the diocese of Carlisle. Value, £86.* Patrons, the Dean and Chapter of Carlisle. The church was built in 1739 [sic; 1839?]. There is a partially endowed school."

Scalescheugh Hall, which stands outside the village near to the A6 road dates from 1746 and was enlarged in 1913–1914. It was many years a residential home for cerebral palsy sufferers and has since been converted into apartments though the building suffered a large fire in September 2019. There are the remains of a Roman fort at Park Farm House half a mile NE of the village, to the west of the Roman road from York to Carlisle.

The pub restaurant, the Plough Inn, has been the meeting place at Candlemas since the 1660s of local trustees known as the Twelve Men of Wreay. Originally local landowners, they contributed to the upkeep of the church, appointed and paid the salary of the priest-cum-schoolmaster, and acted as guardians of the poor. The Twelve, who second new members as required, still meet annually. Traditionally they would eat a meal of bread, cheese, oatcake, butter and ale, smoke long clay pipes, tell tales of bygone days, and sing songs. The institution of the Twelve Men was the subject of a local television report in 2011.

Visitors to the Plough on Shrove Tuesday 1790 were the local landowner and industrialist John Losh (died 1814), father of Sara and resident at the mansion of Woodside, three miles up the road, Charles Howard, 11th Duke of Norfolk, Losh's brother James, and his cousin Joseph Liddell. They began the custom of annually electing a Mayor of Wreay, but this was abolished 90 years later due to rowdyism.

There is a path from the village to Wreay Woods Nature Reserve, a remnant of a much larger expanse of woodland alongside the River Petteril, managed by the Cumbria Wildlife Trust.

Facilities
The village primary school has around 100 pupils, and is rated Outstanding by Ofsted.

The village has an equestrian centre.

Wreay railway station, on what became the West Coast Main Line, opened in 1843 but closed in 1953.

See also

Listed buildings in St Cuthbert Without
List of English and Welsh endowed schools (19th century)

References

External links

 Cumbria County History Trust: Wreay (nb: provisional research only – see Talk page)
Side view of the church. Retrieved 20 October 2012.
Some photographs of the church. Retrieved 20 October 2012.
An illustrated personal account of a visit to the church. Retrieved 20 October 2012.
Some photographs of external window carvings on the church. Retrieved 20 October 2012.
A video of the school, focusing on its partnership with the University of Cumbria. Retrieved 20 October 2012.

Villages in Cumbria
Former civil parishes in Cumbria
City of Carlisle